The 2001 Züri-Metzgete was the 86th edition of the Züri-Metzgete road cycling one day race. It was held on 26 August 2001 as part of the 2001 UCI Road World Cup. The race was won by Paolo Bettini of Italy.

Result

References 

Züri-Metzgete
Züri-Metzgete
Züri-Metzgete